Susan Marie Rojcewicz (born May 29, 1953) is an American former basketball player who competed in the 1976 Summer Olympics. She was born in Worcester, Massachusetts.  After culminating her college career at Southern Connecticut State University in 1975, Rojcewicz became a physical education instructor and assistant basketball coach at Penn State University. Rojcewicz was inducted into the Women's Basketball Hall of Fame in 2000.

USA Basketball
In 1975, Rojcewicz was selected to represent the United States' national team in the FIBA World Championship for Women in Colombia and the Pan American Games in Mexico City, Mexico. She teamed up with high school star Nancy Lieberman and fellow college stars Ann Meyers and Pat Head. In the FIBA World Championship, the United States compiled a 4–3 record and finished in eighth place. Rojcewicz averaged 7.7 points per game. In the Pan American Games, the United States team went unbeaten in seven games to win the gold medal, their first win since 1963.

Rojcewicz was named to the USA Basketball National Team to represent the US at the 1976 Olympics, the first year that women's basketball would be played at the Olympics. The USA team ended with a record of 3–2, losing to the eventual gold medal champion USSR in the semifinal game, and winning the final game against Czechoslovakia to take home the silver medal. Rojcewicz averaged 7.2 points per game.

See also
List of Pennsylvania State University Olympians

References

External links
 Women's Basketball HOF profile

1953 births
Living people
All-American college women's basketball players
American people of Polish descent
American women's basketball players
Basketball players at the 1975 Pan American Games
Basketball players at the 1976 Summer Olympics
Basketball players from Worcester, Massachusetts
College women's basketball players in the United States
Medalists at the 1976 Summer Olympics
Olympic silver medalists for the United States in basketball
Pan American Games gold medalists for the United States
Pan American Games medalists in basketball
Penn State Lady Lions basketball coaches
Southern Connecticut State University alumni
Medalists at the 1975 Pan American Games
United States women's national basketball team players